is the 14th studio album by Japanese singer/songwriter Mari Hamada, released on October 21, 1998. Produced by Hamada and Jody Gray, it was Hamada's first release by Polydor Records. The album was reissued alongside Hamada's past releases on January 15, 2014.

Philosophia peaked at No. 18 on Oricon's albums chart.

Track listing

Charts

Personnel 
 Michael Landau – guitar
 Dean Parks – guitar
 Takashi Masuzaki – guitar
 Hiroyuki Ohtsuki – guitar
 Leland Sklar – bass
 Robbie Buchanan – keyboards
 Kevin Savigor – keyboards
 John Robinson – drums
 Mike Baird – drums
 Lenny Castro – percussion
 Grant Geissan – mandolin
 Sid Page – violin

References

External links 
  (Mari Hamada)
  (Universal Music Japan)
 
 

1998 albums
Japanese-language albums
Mari Hamada albums
Polydor Records albums